Barbie & the Diamond Castle is a 2008 direct-to-video computer-animated musical film directed by Gino Nichele and produced by Mattel Entertainment with Rainmaker Entertainment. It first premiered on Nickelodeon on September 7, 2008, and it was later released to DVD on September 9, 2008.

The thirteenth entry in the Barbie film series, the film features the voice of Kelly Sheridan as Barbie and the cover of the song "Connected" recorded by Katharine McPhee. It follows the story of Liana and Alexa (the in-universe roles of the dolls, Barbie and Teresa) on their journey to find the mysterious diamond castle.

Official description 
"Barbie and Teresa tell us the fairy tale story of Liana and Alexa, best friends who share everything including their love of music."

"One day their simple lives change when they are given an enchanted mirror and befriend the girl trapped inside! To save their new friend, Liana and Alexa embark on a dangerous journey to the hidden Diamond Castle, that will put their friendship to the test. But through the power of song and with the companionship of two adorable puppies, the girls face their challenges together and learn that friendship is the true treasure."

Plot
The story is told by Barbie and her best friend Teresa to Barbie's sister, Stacie, who had a fight with her own friend, Courtney. This is to teach Stacie the power of friendship.

Liana and Alexa are two friends who live in a cottage, where they grow and sell flowers for a living. They both share the same love for music. One day, they find two heart-shaped stones and make them into necklaces to symbolize their friendship. That evening, a storm rolls in, destroying their garden. The next day, Liana offers her food to a poor, old woman who gives them a mirror in exchange. Later, the two hear a voice from the mirror and find a girl inside it named Melody. The trio bond over music and Melody teaches them a song of her own, but are soon attacked by a dragon named Slyder. They manage to escape him, but their cottage catches fire and burns down.

Melody explains that she was once the apprentice of the three Muses who lived in the Diamond Castle. One of the Muses, Lydia, turned evil and planned to take the Diamond castle for herself. After hiding the castle and entrusting Melody with its key, the other Muses, Dori and Phaedra, were turned into stone by Lydia, and Melody sealed herself in the mirror to hide. Melody tells Liana and Alexa that Lydia can be defeated if they play the Muses' instruments. Liana insists on helping Melody and Alexa reluctantly agrees. On their journey, Liana and Alexa adopt two puppies, naming them Sparkles and Lily. At the village, Liana and Alexa meet twins, Ian and Jeremy. The girls are confronted by Lydia who orders them to hand over Melody. When they refuse, Lydia attempts to hypnotize them with her flute but they are shielded by the stones on their necklaces (revealed to be from the Diamond Castle). The girls escape with the help of Ian and Jeremy who join them on their journey but are separated when Liana and Alexa are carried off by a magic bridge.

After running out of provisions, Alexa begins to lose heart. They arrive at a nearby mansion and are greeted by its gracious hosts who, hypnotized by Lydia, tell them that they are the mansion's prophesied owners. Taken in by its luxuries, Alexa suggests abandoning their quest and living in the mansion, but Liana insists on helping Melody, driving them apart. Liana and Melody leave and Alexa angrily takes off her necklace, whereupon she is abducted and hypnotized by Lydia. Liana is captured by Slyder and her hands are tied up by ropes. Alexa is ordered to leap off a ledge if Melody does not give her the castle's location. Melody agrees, to save Liana and Alexa, but Slyder unties Liana and knocks them off the ledge anyway. Liana manages to hang on to the ledge and Alexa. Liana returns Alexa's necklace and breaks Lydia's spell.

After making amends, Liana and Alexa are rescued by the boys, who go with them to the Diamond Castle's location. While Slyder is distracted by the twins, Lydia creates a whirlpool and orders them to walk in and drown, but Liana manages to grab her flute. Lydia demands its return, threatening to break the mirror, but Melody shatters the mirror from inside to stop her. The mirror is thrown into the whirlpool but is saved by Sparkles and Lily. When Lydia's flute drops in the water, she wades in to get it, but the flute, waterlogged, backfires and Lydia seemingly disappears.

Thinking the Diamond Castle can bring Melody back, the girls realize that Melody's song is the key. They sing together and the Diamond Castle reappears. Stepping inside, Liana and Alexa are magically given new dresses and Melody is freed from the mirror. The girls enter the music room, but Lydia returns with Slyder. The three of them play the Muses' instruments and sing together, overpowering Lydia and turning her and Slyder to stone. The other Muses are freed and Lydia's spells are finally undone.

Liana and Alexa are then crowned princesses of music and Melody finally becomes a Muse. Melody invites them to live in the castle, but they choose instead to return to their old life with their new pets, with the Muses giving the two magic seeds which can blossom instantly into golden flowers.

As the story ends, Stacie realizes nothing can break true friendship and goes to apologize to Courtney; Barbie and Teresa resume playing music together, happily.

Characters
Kelly Sheridan as Barbie/Princess Liana – Barbie stars as Princess Liana, a peasant girl/princess of music who shares a cottage in the forest with her best friend Alexa. Liana is loyal and brave. She's not afraid of tricky situations (except for thunder and lightning) and she loves to sing.
Cassidy Ladden as Teresa/Princess Alexa – Teresa also stars as Princess Alexa, a gardener/princess of music who lives in a cottage with Liana. They are best friends, though Alexa often wishes that they could live in grand style, so they won't have to worry about anything. She believes in magic, and she has a silly sense of humor. She has a beautiful singing voice.
Maryke Hendrikse as Melody – Melody used to be an apprentice to the two Muses of Music who live in the Diamond Castle. She was trapped inside the magic mirror while trying to hide from Lydia. She loves to sing in harmony with Princesses Liana and Alexa.
Jeremy From as Jeremy and Noel Johansen as Ian – Jeremy and Ian are twin musicians who sing and play guitar. They befriend Liana and Alexa and help them battle with Lydia on their way to the Diamond Castle.
Kathleen Barr as Lydia – Lydia is an evil former Muse and current sorceress who wants Diamond Castle for herself, with the intention of making it gloomy.  She plays her flute to use her evil spells. She is the main antagonist.
Mark Acheson as Slyder – Slyder is a clumsy, flying serpent and assistant of Lydia. He is the second antagonist.
Veena Sood as Sparkles/Lily – Sparkles, a cocker spaniel pup, and Lily, West highland terrier pup, are a pair of adorable puppies. Liana and Alexa adopt them while on their journey to the Diamond Castle.
Nicole Oliver as Dori and Heather Doerksen as Phaedra – The Muses of Music, who reside in the Diamond Castle and are gifted with magical musical abilities.  Though there are only two of them, their numbers originally included Lydia, who cast a spell that turned all the residents in the Diamond Castle to stone.

Cast

Soundtrack

Track listing 
A soundtrack for the film was released on September 2, 2008. The soundtrack's track list is as follows:
 "Connected"
 "Two Voices, One Song"
 "We're Gonna Find It"
 "Believe"
 "Two Voices, One Song (Movie Version)"
 "Wonderful Me"
 "We're Gonna Find It (Movie Version)"
 "Double Vision"
 "Connected"
 "I Need to Know" (Bonus Track)
 "Shine" (Bonus Track)
 "I'm On My Way" (Bonus Track)

Notes
The songs "I Need to Know" and "Shine" were originally from Barbie as the Island Princess and Barbie in the 12 Dancing Princesses, respectively.
"Connected" is an English cover from the Mexican pop group RBD's song "Tenerte Y Quererte", from their 2004 album, Rebelde.
When Liana, Alexa, and Melody reveal the Diamond Castle, Johannes Brahms's Symphony No. 1 is played as they enter it.
A sneak peek of Barbie & the Diamond Castle aired on Nickelodeon.
Beethoven's "Ode to Joy" is played by the Three Muses during the telling of their story

See also 

 Barbie (media franchise)
 Barbie as the Princess and the Pauper
 Barbie as the Island Princess
 Barbie and the Secret Door

References

External links 
 
 
 

Barbie films
2008 computer-animated films
Films set in the 21st century
Films set in castles
Films set in Europe
2000s English-language films
Universal Pictures direct-to-video films
Animated films about friendship
2008 direct-to-video films
2008 films
Films set in the 2000s
American children's animated adventure films
American children's animated fantasy films
American direct-to-video films
American children's animated musical films
American fantasy adventure films
Canadian direct-to-video films
Canadian independent films
Canadian animated feature films
Canadian animated fantasy films
Canadian children's fantasy films
Canadian fantasy adventure films
Universal Pictures direct-to-video animated films
2000s American animated films
Animated films about dragons
2000s children's animated films
2000s children's fantasy films
2000s fantasy adventure films
2000s musical fantasy films
Canadian musical fantasy films
2000s Canadian films